The AI Song Contest is an international music competition for songs that have been composed using artificial intelligence (AI). The inaugural edition took place on 12 May 2020 and was organised by the Dutch public broadcaster VPRO, in collaboration with NPO 3FM and NPO Innovation. Since 2021, the contest has been held as part of an annual conference organised by the Belgian technology hub Wallifornia MusicTech.

Format 
The format of the competition was created by the Dutch programme creator Karen van Dijk (VPRO) and was inspired by the Eurovision Song Contest. Participating teams are tasked with the composition of a song using artificial intelligence. Each submission is then evaluated by a jury, which assesses the use of AI in the songwriting process, and by the public, which assesses the quality of the song through online ratings. The winner of the contest is the entry with the highest overall score.

Unlike the Eurovision Song Contest, countries can be represented by multiple teams. While the 2020 edition only allowed teams from "Eurovision countries" to compete, this rule was dropped in 2021 to allow teams from outside Europe and Australia to enter as well. In addition, entries would no longer be judged for their suitability for the Eurovision Song Contest, and the maximum song length was extended from three to four minutes. In 2022, a semi-final was introduced in which the jury selected fifteen entries to advance to the final.

Past editions

Awards and nominations

See also 
 Algorithmic composition
 Computer music
 Music and artificial intelligence
 Pop music automation

External links 
 Official website

References 

2020 establishments in the Netherlands
Artificial intelligence art
Computer music
Recurring events established in 2020
Song contests